The place names of the Maghreb come from a variety of origins, mostly Arabic and Berber, but including a few derived from Phoenician, Latin, and several other languages.  This is well illustrated by the three largest cities of Algeria, for instance: Algiers from Arabic al-jazā'ir "the islands", Oran from wahran from Berber wa-iharan "place of lions" and Constantine (Arabic Qasantina ) from the Latin name of the emperor Constantine. Phoenician names include Jijel, shortened from Latin Igilgili, from Phoenician i gilgilt "Skull Island" (according to Lipinski), and Carthage, ultimately from Punic qrt-ḥdšt "New City."

Given the fact that Arabs founded very few cities in the regions they conquered, a large portion of cities in Arab countries have non-Arab etymologies. Many places, however, have had their names changed and "Arabized."  

The following toponymic elements are common in place names in the Maghreb:
agadir, granary, wall , from Punic , ʾgdr, the name of ancient Cadiz
aghbal أغبال, spring.  
adrar أدرار, mountain.  
tit eye, source, plural tittawin. 
aït or ath آيت, "sons of".  
ighrem "settlement"  
azrou أزرو, "stone" from  "azru"
berkane بركان, "black" from  aberkan.
bordj برج, fort.  from Arabic.
bou بو, place of (literally "father of").
casbah قصبة, old quarter of a town.  
chergui شرقي (pl. cheraga شراقة), eastern.  
chott شطّ, a swampy salt lake.  Maghrebi Arabic, from  shātī شاطئ
dar دار, pl. diar ديار, home.  
djebel جبل, mountain.  
djemaa جامع, mosque. 
douar دوار, (traditionally) region about the size of a county 
erg "field of dunes" (in the Sahara.)
foggara "irrigation channel" (in the Sahara.) 
gharbi غربي, "western"  
hamada, "barren rock plain" (in the Sahara.)
hamra f., hmar m. أحمر, "red"  
hassi حاسي, "well" (in the Sahara.)
i, Latin transcriptions of Punic  ("island, coastland"), from Egyptian iw ("island")
idhan "sand dunes", Tamahaq, the Tuareg language.  
ifrane "caves". 
ighil "hill".  
in "of", Tamahaq, Tuareg language. 
kalaa قلعة, "fortress".  
khemis خميس, "Thursday".  
ksar قصر, "fortified town, castle".   from Latin castrum
lalla لالاّ, "female saint". Maghrebi Arabic from 
larbâa "Wednesday".  
melloul ملول, mellal ملال, mellil مليل, "white" from  amellal.
mersa مرسى, "port" 
n ن, "of" 
oued واد. Maghrebi Arabic from  wādī وادي
ouled ولاد, "sons of"  Maghrebi Arabic from  awlâd أولاد.
ras راس, "cape, head" 
 rus ("head, cape")
sebkha ou sabkha, "salt pan"
seghir صغير, "small" 
si سي or sidi سيدي, "male saint" 
souk سوق, "market"  مرسى, search
tadrart "the rock" Tamahaq. 
tala تالا, "spring" ; attested as early as Sallust's time in the form Thala.
tan, tin "of, in" Tamahaq. 
taourirt تاوريرت, "hill". 
tedles تدلس, "reeds".  
tehe "pass" Tamahaq, Tuareg language. 
tell تل, "hill" 
tizi تيزي, "pass" 
Ténéré صحراء تينيري, "desert" 
Wahran وهران, "lions",  
wan, win "of" Tamahaq. 
zaouia زاوية "Quranic school" Maghrebi Arabic, from  "corner".
zemmour زمور.   azemmur, f. tazemmurt "olive tree". 
Zenati زناتي, from the medieval  tribe Zenata. 
zeriba زريبة, "stockade"  
zmala زمالة, pl. zmoul زمول "encampment"

References

Citations

Bibliography
 .

Maghreb
Sahrawi culture
Names of places in Africa
Place name etymologies